Fouad Brighache (born May 10, 1982) is a German footballer who currently plays for SV Germania Steinheim.

References

External links 
 

1982 births
Living people
German footballers
German people of Moroccan descent
Kickers Offenbach players
TuS Koblenz players
SV Darmstadt 98 players
SV Eintracht Trier 05 players
3. Liga players
Association football defenders
Footballers from Frankfurt
SC Hessen Dreieich players